The Flame of the Yukon is the title of two silent films:

 The Flame of the Yukon (1917 film)
 The Flame of the Yukon (1926 film)